William Connolly VC ( – 31 December 1891) was an English recipient of the Victoria Cross, the highest and most prestigious award for gallantry in the face of the enemy that can be awarded to British and Commonwealth forces.

Biography
William Connolly was born in Liverpool, Lancashire, England c1816. No baptism record has been found for him, his birth details and the identity of his parents are unknown.

After working as a stableman, he enlisted as a soldier in the Honourable East India Company on 2 May 1837 at Liverpool. Later that year he sailed on the ship Exmouth to India to serve as a gunner in the Bengal Horse Artillery. He was given a medical discharge in 1859, at the age of 43 years, after 21 years and 3 months service, due to wounds received on 7 July 1857 at Jhelum during the Battle of Jhelum, British India during the Indian Mutiny. He was awarded the VC for his bravery at Jhelum. He was described as having an indifferent character. In physical appearance he was 5 feet 7 inches tall, he had brown hair, brown eyes and a fresh complexion. He returned home to England from India on the ship Alfred.

Back in Liverpool Connolly was now an army pensioner. He lodged with Thomas and Catherine Burrows at 124 Upper Mann Street Toxteth, Liverpool in 1861 and with the Dodd family at 40 Seacombe Street Everton, Liverpool in 1881. Catherine Burrows was formerly Catherine Connolly, so she was probably a relative. Thomas and Catherine were married on 17 December 1848 at St John The Baptist church in Toxteth. Catherine's father, Michael Connolly, was a warehouseman. She was living in Mill Street Toxteth at the time of the marriage.

In 1883 he gave a testimonial that was used in an advertising campaign for a universal remedy called "Eclectica":

He improved his financial standing by selling his VC at auction in 1886 for £10. This was bought by Charles Winter, the newly appointed head of the Medal Department at Spink. The first sale at auction of a VC was in 1884. Towards the end of his life he lived in Great Homer Street Everton and had a deposit at Great Homer Street Post Office Savings Bank. He died on 31 December 1891 of bronchitis at the Johnson family's residence at 14 Westminster Road Kirkdale, Liverpool. He was 75 years old. Mrs Johnson's daughter, Emma Catterall, was present at his death and informed the Kirkdale Registrar, Robert Henry Webster, the next day. He was buried on 4 January 1892 in Section CE 17 Grave 220 at Kirkdale Cemetery. The mode of burial was 'Public' so the grave was unmarked. Most people were buried in 'Public' graves in those days. He made provision for his own funeral in his will and left £37 12s to his friend and doctor, Thomas Hill, of 6 Westminster Road. The solicitor involved in the probate was William Henry Quilliam.

Most biographies of Connolly make no reference to his will and wrongly assume he died in poverty. Some authors suggest that William Connelly, labourer, aged 73 years, residing at Walton Workhouse in 1891 was William Connolly VC. This man was probably William Connell who died at Walton Workhouse aged 74 years and was buried at St Mary's Bootle on 24 February 1893. Similar biographical content detailing Connolly's supposed decline into poverty was given to the Liverpool Echo by local politicians when a plaque was unveiled on the grave at Kirkdale Cemetery in 2015. Prior to this event there was an appeal by Liverpool City Council for help in tracing any relatives of William Connolly. Researchers from Liverpool & South West Lancashire Family History Society and RootsChat genealogy forums found out that Connolly had left a will. Information about the existence of a will was forwarded to the relevant person but unfortunately it was not followed up on. Correspondence sent to the Liverpool Echo revealed some of the contents of the will, highlighted mistakes in Connolly's biography and was generally critical of previous accounts of Connolly's life.

Details
Connolly was about 41 years old, and a gunner in the Bengal Horse Artillery during the Indian Mutiny when the following deed took place on 7 July 1857 at Jhelum, British India, for which he was awarded the VC:

The medal
Today, his medal is on public display in the British in India Museum in Nelson, Lancashire, England.

References

William Connolly VC website

Indian Rebellion of 1857 recipients of the Victoria Cross
British recipients of the Victoria Cross
British East India Company Army soldiers
1816 births
1891 deaths
Victoria Cross awardees from Liverpool